Sublette is a village in Lee County, Illinois, United States. The population was 449 at the 2010 census.

History
The earliest references to Sublette as a town are from plat maps dating to the 1850s. At this point in time, Sublette was known as "Hanno" (named for Hanau, Prussia). It was a small cluster of houses just north of the settlement at Knox Grove.

In 1854, the Illinois Central Railroad built a line through Hanno and constructed a depot there for passenger and freight services. A plat map from the following year lists the town's name as being "Soublette"  or the "Town of Soublett". The town name was officially changed to "Sublette" by an act of the state legislature in 1857. The name is unaffiliated with the town being sublet from the railroad; it likely traces back to an Americanized spelling of the French surname Soblet.

Geography

Sublette is located in southern Lee County at  (41.643141, -89.230460). U.S. Route 52 passes through the village as North Pennsylvania Avenue. US 52 leads northwest  to Amboy and southeast  to Mendota.

Demographics

As of the census of 2000, there were 456 people, 189 households, and 127 families residing in the village. The racial makeup of the village was 97.81% White, 0.88% African American, 0.22% Native American, 0.88% from other races, and 0.22% from two or more races. Hispanic or Latino of any race were 4.82% of the population.

There were 189 households, out of which 30.2% had children under the age of 18 living with them, 56.6% were married couples living together, 8.5% had a female householder with no husband present, and 32.8% were non-families. 29.6% of all households were made up of individuals, and 14.3% had someone living alone who was 65 years of age or older. The average household size was 2.41 and the average family size was 3.02.

In the village, the population was spread out, with 24.3% under the age of 18, 7.2% from 18 to 24, 28.1% from 25 to 44, 24.1% from 45 to 64, and 16.2% who were 65 years of age or older. The median age was 38 years. For every 100 females, there were 97.4 males. For every 100 females age 18 and over, there were 92.7 males.

The median income for a household in the village was $43,393, and the median income for a family was $51,250. Males had a median income of $40,368 versus $22,500 for females. The per capita income for the village was $22,982. About 2.4% of families and 4.0% of the population were below the poverty line, including none of those under age 18 and 4.2% of those age 65 or over.

References

External links
  Village of Sublette official website

Villages in Lee County, Illinois
Villages in Illinois